Arvo Askola (2 December 1909, Valkeala – 23 November 1975) was a Finnish long-distance runner. He won silver medals in the 10,000 m event at the 1936 Olympics and 1934 European Championships.

References

External links 
 

1909 births
1975 deaths
People from Valkeala
People from Viipuri Province (Grand Duchy of Finland)
Finnish male long-distance runners
Finnish male steeplechase runners
Athletes (track and field) at the 1936 Summer Olympics
Olympic athletes of Finland
Olympic silver medalists for Finland
European Athletics Championships medalists
Medalists at the 1936 Summer Olympics
Olympic silver medalists in athletics (track and field)
Sportspeople from Kymenlaakso
20th-century Finnish people